Sportski klub za hokej na ledu Crvena zvezda is an ice hockey club from Belgrade, Serbia, currently playing in the International Hockey League and the Serbian Hockey League. The club is a part of the SD Crvena Zvezda sports association.

SKHL Crvena zvezda was established in 1946 and played in the Yugoslav Ice Hockey League until 1991. Since 1992, the club has won nine national league titles in the Serbian Hockey League, its last national championship coming in 2021. Red Star played two seasons in the now defunct Panonian League between 2007 and 2009.

Red Star play their home games at Pionir Ice Hall in Belgrade.

Honours and achievements

Yugoslav Ice Hockey League
Runners-up (1): 1985
Third place (3): 1961, 1975, 1991

Yugoslav Ice Hockey Cup
Winners (1): 1980

Serbian Hockey League
Winners (9): 1992, 1993, 1996, 1997, 2005, 2018, 2019, 2020, 2021
Runners-up (9): 1994, 1995, 1998, 2002, 2004, 2006, 2011, 2016, 2017

Serbian Hockey Cup
Winners (4): 1992, 1996, 1997, 1998
Runners-up (3): 1995, 2000, 2001

International Hockey League
Winners (1): 2019

Balkan League
Third place (3): 1995, 1996, 1997

Panonian League
Third place (1): 2009

See also
Red Star Belgrade (football team)

Crvena zvezda
Ice hockey teams in Serbia
Ice hockey clubs established in 1946
Sport in Belgrade
Serbian Hockey League teams
Panonian League teams
Yugoslav Ice Hockey League teams
Carpathian League teams
Interliga (1999–2007) teams
Slovenian Ice Hockey League teams
1946 establishments in Serbia